Oluwafemi Balogun (born 1987) is a Nigerian chess player. In 2016 he won the Africa Zone 4.4 Individual Championship, and as a result he was awarded the title FIDE Master. The following year, Balogun won this event for the second time and qualified to play in the FIDE World Cup, held later in the same year in Batumi, Georgia. He was also granted the title International Master for this victory. In the World Cup, Balogun was defeated by World Champion Magnus Carlsen in the first round, becoming the first African to play against a reigning world champion in a competitive match.

References

External links 
 

1987 births
Living people
Chess International Masters
Nigerian chess players
Date of birth missing (living people)
Place of birth missing (living people)